Dorin Negrau is a Romanian born fashion designer.

Career in fashion
Dorin was born in 1970, and  started his career in fashion in Romania in the beginning’s of the 90s, and he presented for the first time at Bucharest Fashion Week. In 1992, he founded the label Dorin Negrau and presented for the first time at New York Fashion Week in September 2014. His collections aim real women spirit whom like to look their best but also to be practical in the same time, rather than just pin-thin runway models. Inspired by his Transylvanian heritage, dark colors filled his designs, while allowing the traditional and warm family feelings to come into play.
As a result of this different approach and efforts to present his collection’s worldwide, his garments/products can be purchased in different stores in Europe, USA, Middle East, and Asia.

Dorin Negrau’s pharmacist studies and training have made him naturally answer the only way he knows best by launching de beauty project named Dorin Negrau Laboratoire. The product is an alternative to non-surgery in order to obtain Botox-like effects for the face using innovative and non-allergic ingredients from luxury cosmetic industry.

The presence of Dorin's creations in different specialized fairs and exhibitions Fashion Week shows, have assured the “Dorin Negrau” brand a top place in the current fashion market. While the Romanian press is appreciating his ingenuity and his talent, his products are included now among high-end women’s ready-to-wear labels.

Private life
In his private life, Dorin Negrau lives in Transylvania and is using his native land as a source of inspiration for his collections.

External links
 Celebrities

References

Living people
Romanian fashion designers
Year of birth missing (living people)